Luis Soto (born 24 April 1945) is a Colombian footballer. He competed in the men's tournament at the 1968 Summer Olympics.

References

External links

1945 births
Living people
Colombian footballers
Colombia international footballers
Olympic footballers of Colombia
Footballers at the 1968 Summer Olympics
Footballers from Cali
Association football defenders
1975 Copa América players
Deportes Tolima footballers
Millonarios F.C. players
Independiente Santa Fe footballers